A Beginner's Mind is a collaborative album by American musicians Sufjan Stevens and Angelo De Augustine. The album was released by Asthmatic Kitty on September 24, 2021. After being teased by Asthmatic Kitty for several days, the album was formally announced on July 7, 2021, along with its track listing and two singles, "Reach Out" and "Olympus". Daniel Anum Jasper created the album's cover artwork. 

The album was met with widespread acclaim from music critics.

Background 
A Beginner’s Mind was created in a cabin in upstate New York. There, Stevens and Augustine watched movies every day for inspiration.

Critical reception 

The album received widespread acclaim from critics. At Metacritic, which assigns a normalized rating out of 100 to reviews from professional publications, the album received an average score of 81, based on 11 reviews, indicating "universal acclaim". Aggregator AnyDecentMusic? gave the album a 8.0 out of 10, based on their assessment of the critical consensus.

In the review for AllMusic, critic Mark Demming felt that the album was "intelligent and well-crafted, and will appeal to fans of either Stevens' or De Augustine's recent work" but also that it was "less distinct than the music they create on their own."

Track listing

List of films taken from Asthmatic Kitty's Instagram page.

Personnel
 Angelo De Augustine – production, mixing, recording, arrangement, vocals, bass, bells, cymbals, drums, guitar, piano, synthesizer, tambourine, ukulele, whistle, Wurlitzer
 Sufjan Stevens – production, mixing, recording, arrangement, vocals, bass, bells, cymbals, drums, guitar, piano, synthesizer, tambourine, ukulele, whistle, Wurlitzer
 Josh Bonati – mastering
 Daniel Anum Jasper – artwork

Charts

References

2021 albums
Sufjan Stevens albums
Angelo De Augustine albums
Asthmatic Kitty albums
Collaborative albums
Concept albums